The 2018 USA Women's Sevens was the first tournament of the 2018–19 World Rugby Women's Sevens Series. It was played on 20–21 October 2018 at Infinity Park in Glendale, Colorado, the first time the USA Women's Sevens was held at the venue.

Format
The teams were drawn into three pools of four teams each. Each team played every other team in their pool once. The top two teams from each pool advanced to the Cup/Plate brackets while the top 2 third place teams also competed in the Cup/Plate. The other teams from each group played-off for the Challenge Trophy.

Teams
Eleven core teams participated in the tournament along with one invited team, Mexico:

Pool stage
All times in Mountain Daylight Time (UTC−06:00)

Pool A

Pool B

Pool C

Knockout stage

Challenge Trophy

Fifth place

Cup

Tournament placings

Source: World Rugby

Players

Scoring leaders

Source: World Rugby

See also
 World Rugby Women's Sevens Series
 2018–19 World Rugby Women's Sevens Series
 World Rugby

References

External links 
 Tournament site
 World Rugby info

2016
2018–19 World Rugby Women's Sevens Series
2018 in women's rugby union
2018 in American rugby union
rugby union
2018 rugby sevens competitions
2018 in sports in Colorado
October 2018 sports events in the United States